Craven County Schools is a PK–12 graded school district serving Craven County, North Carolina. Its 25 schools serve 15,048 students as of the 2010–11 school year.

Student demographics
For the 2015–16 school year, Craven County Schools had a total of 14,171 students and 897.59 teachers o, for a student-teacher ratio of 15.79:1.

Governance
The primary governing body of Craven County Schools follows a council–manager government format with a seven-member Board of Education appointing a Superintendent to run the day-to-day operations of the system. The school system currently resides in the North Carolina State Board of Education's Second District.

Board of Education
The seven members of the Board of Education generally meet on the third Thursday of each month. The current members of the board are: Frances Boomer (Chair), Kim Smith (Vice-Chair), Naomi Clark, Victor Dove, Carr Ipock, Stefanie A. King, and Kelli S. Muse.

Superintendent
Dr. Wendy A. Miller is the Superintendent of Craven County Schools.

Member schools
Craven County Schools has 25 schools ranging from pre-kindergarten to twelfth grade. Those 25 schools are separated into five high schools, five middle schools, and 15 elementary schools.

High schools
 Havelock High School (Havelock)
 Craven Early College High School (New Bern)
 Early College EAST High School (Havelock)
 New Bern High School (New Bern)
 West Craven High School (Vanceboro)

Middle schools
 Grover C. Fields Middle School (New Bern)
 Havelock Middle School (Havelock)
 H. J. MacDonald Middle School (New Bern)
 Tucker Creek Middle School (Havelock)
 West Craven Middle School (Vanceboro)

Elementary schools

Athletics
According to the North Carolina High School Athletic Association, for the 2012–2013 school year:
 Havelock and West Craven are both 3A schools in the Coastal Conference.
 New Bern is a 4A school in the Mideastern Conference.
 Craven Early College and Early College EAST do not have athletic teams.

Awards
The Craven County Schools system has had one school listed as a Blue Ribbon School: Arthur W. Edwards Elementary School (2008). One teacher in the school system has been recognized as a North Carolina Department of Public Instruction Teacher of the Year: Wendy Miller (2005–06). In addition, one former administrator has been recognized as a North Carolina Department of Public Instruction Principal of the Year: Tabari Wallace (2018).

See also
List of school districts in North Carolina

References

External links
 

Education in Craven County, North Carolina
School districts in North Carolina